"Roots to Grow" is a song by Swiss recording artist Stefanie Heinzmann and German musician Gentleman. Produced by Marek Pompetzki and Paul NZA for her second studio album, Roots to Grow (2009), it was released as the album's third single.

Charts

References

External links
  
 

2010 singles
2009 songs
Stefanie Heinzmann songs
Songs written by Peter Vale
Universal Music Group singles